Astakhovsky is a rural locality (a khutor) in Bespalovskoye Rural Settlement, Uryupinsky District, Volgograd Oblast, Russia. The population was 78 as of 2010.

Geography 
Astakhovsky is located in northwest of Volgograd Oblast, 44 km northwest of Uryupinsk (the district's administrative centre) by road. Vikhlyantsevsky is the nearest rural locality.

References 

Rural localities in Uryupinsky District